Milo Barton (born July 29, 1998) is an English footballer who plays as a forward for San Diego 1904 FC in the National Independent Soccer Association.

Career

Youth
In 2008, Barton moved with his family to San Diego when his father was named as the U-18 coach for Los Angeles Galaxy of Major League Soccer.

While playing for the Cathedral Catholic High School boys soccer team, Barton was named to the 2015 and 2016 All-San Diego Section first teams, and won player of the year for the 2016 season.

After originally being committed to play soccer for UC Santa Barbara, Barton opted to instead join the Sounders' academy system. On August 1, 2016, during an interview done by Barton's father, it was announced Barton had signed to be a part of the Sounders' academy.

Professional
Barton made his professional debut with Seattle Sounders FC 2 on September 24, 2016 in a 2–0 loss to Swope Park Rangers in the last match of the 2016 season. Barton appeared for 61 minutes before being subbed off. He made his first start on May 28, 2017 in a 2–2 draw against Sacramento Republic FC.

In late 2019 Barton was signed by San Diego 1904 FC ahead of the team's inaugural season in the newly established National Independent Soccer Association.

International career
In October 2016, Barton was called up by Brad Friedel to the USA under-19 side for a training camp and friendly against Club Tijuana.

Personal life
Barton was born to Warren and Candy Barton. His father, Warren Barton, is a former English footballer and currently a television pundit for Fox Sports in the United States. Barton is one of two children, he is two years older than his younger brother Kane.

Career statistics

References

External links
USSF Development Academy bio

1998 births
Living people
American soccer players
Tacoma Defiance players
Association football forwards
USL Championship players
National Independent Soccer Association players
English expatriate footballers
English expatriates in the United States
English expatriate sportspeople in the United States
Soccer players from San Diego